The Checkmates, Ltd. were an American R&B group from Fort Wayne, Indiana. The group, discovered by Nancy Wilson, included both black and white members; their one major hit was 1969's "Black Pearl", produced by Phil Spector. The song peaked at No. 13 on the U.S. pop chart. Their remake of "Proud Mary" reached No. 30 on the UK Singles Chart in late 1969.

The group broke up in 1970, but reunited in 1974 for a few more years. They performed on the same billing as Frank Sinatra and Herb Alpert, and sang the national anthem for the Thrilla in Manila in 1975. Lead singer Sonny Charles later had a moderately successful career as a solo artist. Charles and Marvin ("Sweet Louie") Smith later reunited and toured the U.S. into the 2000s.

Smith died on December 15, 2007, of a heart attack, while on a cruise ship in the Caribbean where he and Sonny Charles were scheduled to perform. He was 68.

Members
Sonny Charles – lead vocals – (born Charles Hemphill, September 4, 1940, Blytheville, Arkansas) – Charles was later a vocalist with the Steve Miller Band.
Bobby Stevens – vocals
Harvey Trees – guitar
Bill Van Buskirk – bass
Marvin "Sweet Louie" Smith – drums, vocals
Calvin Thomas – drums
Jimmy Milton – vocals

Discography

Albums

Singles

References

External links 
Interviews with Bobby Stevens and Sonny Charles in Soul Express in May 2020
The Checkmates Ltd. story, part 2 - 1969-1975

Musical groups from Indiana
American rhythm and blues musical groups